Blinjski Kut  is a village in the Banovina region of Croatia. The settlement is administered as a part of the City of Sisak and the Sisak-Moslavina County. According to the 2011 census, the village has 277 inhabitants. It is connected by the D224 state road.

Sources

Populated places in Sisak-Moslavina County